Charles Street (8 November 1909 – 24 June 1982) was an Australian rules footballer who played with Richmond and Carlton in the Victorian Football League (VFL).

Street played at Richmond for three seasons, without ever becoming a regular fixture in the team.  He then crossed to Carlton and was in a back pocket in their 1932 VFL Grand Final loss to Richmond.

References

1909 births
Australian rules footballers from Victoria (Australia)
Richmond Football Club players
Carlton Football Club players
1982 deaths